Malek-e Ashtar is a village in Hamadan Province, Iran.

Malek-e Ashtar may refer to:
 Malek-e Ashtar, Bagh-e Malek, Khuzestan Province
 Malek-e Ashtar, Shush, Khuzestan Province
 Malek-e Ashtar, Kohgiluyeh and Boyer-Ahmad